Africanists were the people who encouraged a strong colonial involvement of Spain in Africa, particularly since the early 20th century. Although Spain had been present in African territory for numerous centuries, it was not until the arrival of New Imperialism and the Berlin Conference in 1884 that the colonial power set its interests in African soil. Africanism emerged mainly from the loss of Cuba, the Philippines, Puerto Rico and various other islands in 1898 as a consequence of the Spanish–American War. Africanists sought to compensate for these losses by consolidating their possessions in Africa. Spain's colonizing Africa was smaller when compared to other European colonizers, even after losing their colonies in the Americas and Pacific, because there was a lack of public support to re-establish themselves as an empire. Spain's economy recovered quickly after the loss of their colonies during the Spanish-American War, and the general population lost their fervor for maintaining an empire. Countries like Italy which had started colonizing in the late nineteenth century colonized more than Spain because Italy had much more public support to create an empire.

Within the Army, africanist officers espoused chiefly a conservative worldview with extreme-right views being common. The extreme nationalism and anti-democratic views enabled a potential linkage with Fascism. According to Sebastian Balfour, africanist practices, intertwined with ideas on the "degeneration" of the Spanish masses, would become a core tenet of the ideology of "crusade" present in the 1936 coup d'etat.

Africanism after Spanish-Moroccan Wars 

Spain decided to establish a protectorate in Morocco in 1912, and the government used the Spanish military to administer their new territory. After Spain's evolvement in Morocco, Africanism evolved into a military mentality found within the army that occupied the Moroccan territories. Much of the army, especially the officer class, developed an interest in Spanish occupation because it was easier for both officers and infantry to get promoted as promotion was based on merit and military accomplishments. Many of the officers in the army desired a distinguished military career which led to a growth of support of the movement.

Africanists vs. Junteros 
There was a growing rivalry within the Spanish military between the soldiers stationed in Africa, the Africanists, and the soldiers stationed on Iberian peninsula, the Junteros. Another difference between the two groups was that the Africanists were composed of infantry and cavalry, while the Junteros were composed of artillery units and the majority of the officers in the military. The rivalry began when a conflict of interest arose. After the Spanish-Moroccan wars, the government began to reward the army stationed in Morocco higher pay and quicker promotion. Many Junteros felt envy that they were paid less and lost prestige. The Junteros blocked any support directed to help the soldiers stationed in Africa as an attempt to weaken the Africanists. The rivalry also took sides in the Spanish Civil War with Junteros supporting the Republicans, while the Africanists supporting the nationalists.  Francisco Franco was an important figure in the Africanist movement.

Appeal to Spanish Empire 
Many Africanists supported the concept of empire due to a sense of nationalism. One of the justifications for Spanish imperialism in Africa was Hispanidad. Hispanidad was the idea of racial superiority of the Spanish linguistic-cultural people over those of non-Europeans. The other justification that Africanists used to justify imperialism, specifically in Morocco, was Parentesco. Parentesco was the idea that claimed that the Spanish and Moroccans were racially similar, and thus they should be unified.

Africanists and the public 
The general Spanish public had no interest in imperialistic actions such as the administration of Morocco.  The public also felt resentment not only toward the Africanists, but the military in its entirety. This was due to the military's role to put down populist revolts. The growing alienation from the Spanish mainland pushed Africanists to adopt many Berber traditions found in Morocco, and they respected the Berber's military might and bravery.

Africanists
 Alfonso XIII – King of Spain from 1886 to 1931
 Prince Fernando de Baviera – Infante of Spain
 Alfonso de Orleans – Infante of Spain
 Manuel Fernández Silvestre – a Spanish general
 Damaso Berenguer – a Spanish general
 Alfredo Kindelán – founder of the Spanish Air Force
 José Sanjurjo
 Francisco Franco
 Emilio Mola
 José Millán-Astray
 Juan Yagüe
 Emilio Blanco Izaga
 José Marina

References

Spanish culture
Spanish nationalism
Spanish Empire
Spanish Africanists
Spanish Africa
Morocco–Spain military relations